Hodges Gardens State Park, previously known as Hodges Gardens, Park and Wilderness Area, is located on  between Florien and Hornbeck, near the Toledo Bend Reservoir of the Sabine River in Sabine Parish, in west central Louisiana. The park is located on U.S. Highway 171 some fifteen miles (24 km) south of Many, the seat of Sabine Parish. The facility offers walking trails, formal gardens, arboretum, the Azalea Overlook, waterfalls, and a visitor center. Originally, privately developed during the 1940s and opened to the public in 1956. The park was formally dedicated on May 1, 1959, and transferred to a non-profit foundation in 1960. In April 2007, it became part of the Louisiana public parks system. It is the largest horticultural park and recreation area in the United States and with the acquisition Hodges Garden became the newest park in Louisiana. As of February 20, 2018, ownership of Hodge's Garden State Park was transferred to the A. J. and Nona Trigg Hodges Foundation and closed. The park remains closed with no plans of reopening.

History
The area was once home to bands of Native Americans, Spanish and French Explorers, and Highwaymen that were prominent during the time of the Neutral Strip (Louisiana). A road known as the El Camino Real, or the King's Highway, passed through what became Hodges Garden, and across the Sabine River at Gain's Ferry. It originated in Natchitoches, crossed west central Louisiana, through Texas to Mexico City.

The land included an old quarry. Hodges and his wife, the former Nona Trigg, planned a scenic garden around the natural rock formations. The quarry had been used to supply rocks, stones, and sandstone to build, among other things, the jetties in Port Arthur. Work began on the jetties in 1898; material from the quarry was delivered by wagon that would have been at least a six-day round trip. Water from a  lake created in 1954 is pumped through the gardens to waterfalls, pools, a geyser, fountains, and to the watering system before it is recycled back into the lake.

In 2015, the gardens were listed on the National Register of Historic Places.

Park features

Services and amenities
 Amphitheater
 Bicycle Riding
 Bird Watching
 Boating (Boat rental)
 Cabins
 Lodge (Accommodates up to 52)
 Canoeing (Canoe Rental)
 Fishing (Fishing Pier)
 Hiking
 Kayaking (Kayak Rental)
 Lookout Tower
 Pavilion
 Picnicking
 Tent Area
 Walking
 Waterfall
 Wildlife Viewing

Things to see
Many plants and flowers are grown in tropical greenhouses on the property and some flowers like tulips, hyacinths, & daffodils were imported to add variety for visitors. Flowers were planted on one level above another. Views of water lilies, Neoregelia, Holly Berries. In December 2007 a reported 600 Rose bushes were planted. Easter Sunrise Services, Shakespearean Plays, concerts, Fourth of July Fireworks and more are planned.

There are walkways, foot bridges, streams, waterfalls, overlooks including the lookout tower, and more. A dual stairway has a cascading waterfall down the center, many fountains spewing water into the air, and trees adorned with Spanish moss.

Pictures from the gardens

Returning the gardens to the foundation
After a half century of operations, the gardens and cabins were refurbished by the state and opened to the public on March 20, 2008. Camping facilities became available a few months thereafter. But after nine years, the state, with a tight budget, chose not to continue to operate Hodges Gardens. Instead, the Louisiana Department of Culture, Recreation & Tourism and the Office of State Parks will effective October 1, 2017, return ownership to the A. J. and Nona Triggs Foundation. The state and the foundation have been since 2008 operating the park through a cooperative endeavor agreement.

Mayor Kenneth Freeman of Many and private preservation groups have  sought to preserve Hodges Gardens, which Freeman indicated that he has visited several times a year since 1964, when he was eight years of age. "Every time I go I see something new and beautiful. I don't want to lose that for future generations, not to mention the economic impact it would have on our local economies," Freeman said. He urged area residents to patronize the park on a regular basis.

See also
National Register of Historic Places listings in Sabine Parish, Louisiana

References

External links

HodgesGardens.net
ToledoBendLakeCountry.com -- Official site of the Toledo Bend (Sabine Parish) Tourist Commission
Hodges Gardens State Park - Louisiana Office of State Parks
Hodges Gardens near Toledo Bend Reservoir

State parks of Louisiana
Protected areas of Sabine Parish, Louisiana
Botanical gardens in Louisiana
Parks on the National Register of Historic Places in Louisiana
National Register of Historic Places in Sabine Parish, Louisiana